Kidding is an American comedy-drama television series created by Dave Holstein that premiered on September 9, 2018, on Showtime. The series stars Jim Carrey, Frank Langella, Judy Greer, Cole Allen, Juliet Morris, and Catherine Keener. Michel Gondry serves as executive producer and directed several episodes. In October 2018, Showtime renewed the series for a second season which premiered February 9, 2020. In July 2020, the series was canceled after two seasons.

Premise
Kidding is set in Columbus, Ohio, and follows Jeff Piccirillo, aka beloved children's television presenter Mr. Pickles, appreciated by children and parents alike. Mr. Pickles anchors a multimillion-dollar branding empire, but he faces a personal tragedy and difficult family life.

Cast and characters

Main
 Jim Carrey as Jeff Piccirillo, a television personality who has performed as "Jeff Pickles" on his longtime children's television program Mr. Pickles' Puppet Time on PBS for thirty years. Following the death of one of his sons, he finds great difficulty in adapting to the hardships of life. Zackary Arthur portrays a young Jeff in a recurring role.
 Frank Langella as Sebastian Piccirillo, the executive producer of Mr. Pickles' Puppet Time and Jeff and Didi's father
 Judy Greer as Jill Piccirillo, a nurse and Jeff's estranged ex-wife
 Cole Allen as William "Will" and Philip "Phil" Piccirillo, Jeff and Jill's identical twin sons, the latter of whom died in a car accident
 Juliet Morris as Maddy Perera, Deirdre and Scott's daughter and Jeff's niece
 Catherine Keener as Deirdre "Didi" Perera, the head puppet maker of Mr. Pickles' Puppet Time and Jeff's sister
 Justin Kirk as Peter, an anesthesiologist whom Jill is dating (recurring season 1, main season 2)

Recurring
 Bernard White as Scott Perera, Deirdre's husband
 Alex Raul Barrios as Derrell, the stagehand for Mr. Pickles' Puppet Time
 Julitta Scheel as Cassidy, one of Will's older friends from high school
 Coda Boesel as B.D., one of Will's older friends from high school
 Juliocesar Chavez as Gigs, one of Will's older friends from high school
 Ginger Gonzaga as Vivian, a woman dying of cancer whom Jeff dates until she goes into remission
 Tara Lipinski as herself, an Olympic figure skater hired to star as Mr. Pickles in the "Pickles On Ice-tacular"
 Jennie Pierson as Sara Lipinski, Tara's sister who replaces her as Mr. Pickles' ice-skating double. Jennifer Don portrays her while ice-skating in a guest appearance in the episode "Lt. Pickles".
 Joel Swetow as Michael Epstein, a Rabbi and writer hired by Seb to work on Mr. Pickles' Puppet Time in order to reduce Jeff's workload
 Louis Ozawa Changchien as Mr. Pickles-San, an actor newly hired to portray Mr. Pickles in the Japanese version of Mr. Pickles' Puppet Time who comes to America to shadow Jeff. He stays at Deirdre's home and eventually sleeps with her.
 Jernard Burks as Denny, the truck driver who crashed into the Piccirillo family's car, killing Phil
 Calah Lane as Denny's daughter, who looks after her father and takes care of him as he is harassed by those angry over Phil's death
 Riki Lindhome as Shaina, a former drug addict who turned her life around by watching Mr. Pickles' Puppet Time. After reading a letter from her, Jeff takes her out on a date.
 Annette O'Toole as Louise, Jeff and Deirdre's mother and Sebastian's ex-wife.
 Kelly Coffield Park as Joanne, Jeff and Jill’s realtor

Puppeteers
 Mary Faber as Macy, the puppeteer of Soap Scum on Mr. Pickles' Puppet Time
 Dan Garza as Ennui La Triste, a talking French baguette puppet
 Gwen Hollander as Sheryl, the puppeteer of Astron-Otter on Mr. Pickles' Puppet Time
 Patrick Johnson as The Oops and Maestro Pimento Fermata
 Christian Anderson as Sy the Wide-Eyed Fly
 Mike Quinn as Secret Chef
 Barry Rothbart and Rich Fulcher as Bert and Clay, the two puppeteers of Snagglehorse on Mr. Pickles' Puppet Time

Guest
 Betty Thomas ("Green Means Go")
 Conan O'Brien as himself ("Green Means Go"), the eponymous host of Conan, on which Jeff is a guest
 Danny Trejo as himself ("Green Means Go"), Jeff's fellow guest on Conan
 T'Keyah Crystal Keymáh as Amika ("Pusillanimous"), the make-up artist for Mr. Pickles' Puppet Time
 Matt Evers as Ice Ennui ("LT. Pickles"), the ice-skating performer who portrays Ennui La Triste in the "Pickles On Ice-tacular"
 Ariana Grande as Piccola Grande ("Episode 3101"), the Pickle Fairy of Hope
 Dick Van Dyke as Hopskotch the Sasquatch ("Up, Down and Everything in Between" and "Episode 3101"), a giant puppet who is never seen in its entirety
 Tyler, the Creator as Cornell ("The Acceptance Speech"), who works at a nostalgia therapy center
 Blake Griffin as himself ("A Seat on the Rocket")

Episodes

Season 1 (2018)

Season 2 (2020)

Production

Development
On September 14, 2017, it was announced that Showtime had given the production a straight-to-series order for a first season consisting of ten episodes. The series was created by Dave Holstein who also serves as executive producer alongside Jim Carrey, Michel Gondry, Jason Bateman, Jim Garavente, Raffi Adlan, and Michael Aguilar. Additionally, Holstein wrote the pilot episode and serves as showrunner and Gondry directed the pilot. On June 7, 2018, it was announced that the series would premiere on September 9, 2018.

On October 10, 2018, it was announced that Showtime had renewed the series for a second season consisting of ten episodes that were scheduled to premiere on November 3, 2019. However, in September 2019, Showtime announced that the second season would instead premiere on February 9, 2020. On July 14, 2020, Showtime canceled the series after two seasons.

Casting
Simultaneously with the announcement of the series order, it was confirmed that Jim Carrey had been cast in the series' lead role. On December 14, 2017, it was reported that Catherine Keener had been cast as the series' female lead. On January 4, 2018, it was announced that Frank Langella had joined the main cast in a series regular role. On February 13, 2018, it was reported that Judy Greer had also joined the main cast. On March 15, 2018, it was announced that Justin Kirk had been cast in a recurring role. In May 2018, it was reported that Ginger Gonzaga and Bernard White were joining the cast in a recurring capacity. On July 9, 2018, it was announced that Grace Song had been cast in a recurring role.

Release

Marketing
On June 7, 2018, the series' first official trailer was released. About two weeks later, a teaser trailer featuring a song from the series was released. On August 6, 2018, the series' poster and the second official trailer were released.

Premiere
On September 5, 2018, the series held its official premiere at the Cinerama Dome in Los Angeles, California. Those in attendance included David Nevins, Judy Greer, Jim Carrey, Catherine Keener, and Dave Holstein.

Distribution
In Canada, the series airs on The Movie Network and CraveTV. In France, the series airs on Canal+ Séries. In the United Kingdom, the series has aired on Sky Atlantic, but it later moved to Sky Comedy. In Spain, the series airs on Movistar Series.

Reception

Critical response
The series was met with a positive response from critics upon its premiere. On the review aggregation website Rotten Tomatoes, the first season holds a 77% approval rating, with an average rating of 7.38 out of 10 based on 77 reviews. The website's critical consensus reads, "Fans of Jim Carrey's slapstick may be disappointed, but other viewers may find a surprisingly poignant examination of life and grief in Kidding." Metacritic, which uses a weighted average, assigned the first season a score of 68 out of 100 based on 33 critics, indicating "generally favorable reviews."

In a positive review, Voxs Karen Han praised the series saying, "The deconstruction of a Fred Rogers figure would make for an interesting show on its own, but Kidding transcends that premise by leaps and bounds on the strength of Carrey’s performance and a determination to make the show just as rough--and riveting--as real life." In another favorable critique, The Hollywood Reporters Tim Goodman offered similar acclaim saying, "With its keen self-awareness, exceptional writing and consistently great acting, Kidding — starring a perfectly cast Jim Carrey in his first series-regular role since In Living Color two decades ago — is Showtime's best and most binge-worthy series in a long time." Ben Travers at IndieWire reviewed the first four episodes of the show, and called it an alt-reality Mr. Rogers, and that although the fixation on death is "uncomfortable, [...] it shows signs of a lighter, broader scope and is buoyed by unrelenting optimism." He praised the story for treating Jeff's sincerity with genuine respect, and Carrey for his "terrific" and "nuanced" performance. Kristen Baldwin of Entertainment Weekly gave it a B+ grade and called it a "bittersweet family saga" and is unsure of the direction of the show but "for now, it’s a compelling story about the beauty, and difficulty, of giving your pain a name." In a more mixed assessment, Rolling Stones Alan Sepinwall awarded the series three-and-a-half stars out of five and provided restrained admiration saying, "Carrey’s worth the price of admission, though, even if it’s not the TV comeback vehicle many of his fans would want. Heck, he’d probably be a huge hit just hosting a full-length version of the show within the show, rather than this version that only gives us innocent glimpses amidst all the mourning. But like Jeff Pickles, Carrey wants to lean into the harder parts of life. More often than not with Kidding, he succeeds."

In a negative evaluation, Uproxxs Pilot Viruet compared the series unfavorably to some of Showtimes's past shows saying, "those series found ways to make the humor seem more natural, more fitting with the stories they’re telling. Kiddings approach is more overt and frequently confusing, as if spotting a brightly-colored puppet wandering amongst our real world." Caroline Framke of Variety said that the show succeeds in places but more often than not it "feels caught between too many tones and ideas to become quite as distinctive as it could be." Framke wrote that over the first four episodes the show better understands TV personality and business of Mr. Pickles than it does of grieving father Jeff. Dave Nemetz of TVLine is critical of the tone of the show, saying it is "somewhere between comedy and drama, and isn’t entirely successful at either."

The second season received positive reviews. On Rotten Tomatoes, the season holds a 100% approval rating, with an average rating of 8 out of 10 based on 10 reviews. The website's critical consensus reads, "Kidding lightens its emotional load just enough to craft a sophomore season that is brighter and sweeter and no less insightful than its first."

Ratings

Season 1

Season 2

Awards and nominations

Notes

References

External links
 
 

2018 American television series debuts
2020 American television series endings
2010s American comedy-drama television series
2020s American comedy-drama television series
American television shows featuring puppetry
English-language television shows
Showtime (TV network) original programming
Television series about television
Television shows set in Columbus, Ohio